Voynovo is a rural locality (a selo) in Ilkinskoye Rural Settlement, Melenkovsky District, Vladimir Oblast, Russia. The population was 390 as of 2010. There are 3 streets.

Geography 
Voynovo is located on the Unzha River, 9 km south of Melenki (the district's administrative centre) by road. Lekhtovo is the nearest rural locality.

References 

Rural localities in Melenkovsky District